Guts is an album by Joe McPhee, Peter Brötzmann, Kent Kessler and Michael Zerang recorded in 2005 and released on the Okka Disc label in 2007.

Reception

Allmusic reviewer Phil Freeman states "While the group is capable of Ayler-esque blare, the two horn players (McPhee switches back and forth between saxophones and trumpet or cornet) can also bring things down quite a bit, murmuring introspective phrases with the rhythm section at rest. This happens during each of the two long pieces that make up Guts, and it helps give the listener's ears a momentary break, but also builds tension for when the full ensemble comes back".

Track listing 
All compositions by Joe McPhee, Peter Brötzmann, Kent Kessler and Michael Zerang.
 "Guts" – 17:41
 "Rising Spirits" – 41:16

Personnel 
Peter Brötzmann – alto saxophone, tenor saxophone, clarinet, tárogató
Joe McPhee – alto saxophone, tenor saxophone, trumpet
Kent Kessler – bass
Michael Zerang – drums

References 

Peter Brötzmann live albums
Joe McPhee live albums
2007 live albums
Collaborative albums